The Midnight Express is a 1924 American silent action crime film directed by George W. Hill starring Elaine Hammerstein and William Haines.

Plot
As described in a review in a film magazine, after a wild jazz party, railroad owner John Oakes (Nichols) disowns his son Jack (Haines) for being shiftless. Jack decides to rehabilitate himself and turns over a new leaf by quitting his palatial home and going to work in his father's railroad yard as a laborer in the roundhouse. Chasing an escaped convict, Silent Bill Brachely (Harmon), who had stolen his auto, leads Jack to the home of James Travers (Tilton), engineer of the big locomotive, the Midnight Express. There he meets and falls in love with the engineer’s daughter, Mary (Hammerstein). The convict, who swears to get back at Jack, is sent back to jail. He escapes again and corners Jack in a lonely dispatch station on a mountainside. A terrific fight ensues and Jack wins. just in time to derail However, several freight cars have broken from the train and are speeding down a mountainous grade, heading toward the Midnight Express which is ascending the incline. Jack is able to derail the runaway freight cars just in time to save the Midnight Express. As the result Jack, gets back in his father’s good graces and wins the affections of Mary.

Cast

 Elaine Hammerstein as Mary Travers
 William Haines as Jack Oakes
 George Nichols as John Oakes
 Lloyd Whitlock as Joseph Davies
 Edwin B. Tilton as James Travers
 Pat Harmon as Silent Bill Brachely
 Bertram Grassby as Arthur Bleydon
 Phyllis Haver as Jessie Sybil
 Roscoe Karns as Switch Hogan
 Jack Richardson as Detective Collins
 Noble Johnson as Deputy Sheriff
 Dan Crimmins as Railroad Operator
 George Meadows as Railroad Operator

Reception
Haines, then under contract to Metro-Goldwyn-Mayer, was loaned to Columbia Pictures, then a small studio, for five films, of which The Midnight Express was the first. The film received good reviews, making it Haines' breakout role. He received another boost when later in 1924, during a Screenland interview, flamboyant actress Peggy Hopkins Joyce claimed that the best screen kiss she ever saw was between Haines and Hammerstein in The Midnight Express.

Preservation
A print of The Midnight Express is in the film collection of Cineteca Italiana (Milano).

References

External links

Lobby card at gettyimages.com
Lantern slide at Lilly Library, Indiana University, Bloomington

1924 films
Films directed by George Hill
1924 romantic drama films
American silent feature films
American black-and-white films
American romantic drama films
Columbia Pictures films
1920s American films
Silent romantic drama films
Silent American drama films